Lobothallia is a genus of lichens in the family  Megasporaceae. Species in the genus have foliose thalli that become crustose areolate in the center with age, and grow on calcareous to siliceous rocks. The crustose part of the body may keep its lower cortex, though not always. Dark brown to black apothecia may be sunken into the surface of the thallus, as indicated in the common name puffed sunken disk lichen. The photobiont is green alga from the genus Trebouxia. The genus is represented in Eurasia, Asia, North Africa, Central America, western North America, and Australia.

Species
, Species Fungorum accepts 17 species of Lobothallia.
 Lobothallia alphoplaca 
 Lobothallia brachyloba 
 Lobothallia cernohorskyana 
 Lobothallia chadefaudiana 
 Lobothallia cheresina 
 Lobothallia controversa 
 Lobothallia crassimarginata   – China
 Lobothallia epiadelpha 
 Lobothallia farinosa 
 Lobothallia gangwondoana 
 Lobothallia hedinii 
 Lobothallia helanensis  – China
 Lobothallia hydrocharis 
 Lobothallia lacteola 
 Lobothallia melanaspis 
 Lobothallia praeradiosa 
 Lobothallia pruinosa  – China
 Lobothallia radiosa 
 Lobothallia recedens 
 Lobothallia semisterilis 
 Lobothallia subdiffracta 
 Lobothallia zogtii

References

Pertusariales
Pertusariales genera
Lichen genera
Taxa described in 1984
Taxa named by Georges Clauzade
Taxa named by Claude Roux